Stanley Ntagali (born 1 March 1955) is a Ugandan Bishop of the Anglican Church who served as Former Chancellor of Uganda Christian University and former Archbishop of Kampala from 2012 to 2020.He  also served as Bishop of Masindi-Kitara from 2004 to 2012. He is Currently serving as an Anglican  Bishop in Uganda.

Early life and education
Ntagali was born in Kabale, Uganda to Ernest and Molly Ntagali. At age 16, he and his family migrated to the Hoima District.

Ntagali studied theology and trained for ordained ministry at Bishop Tucker Theological College, an Anglican seminary, graduating with a certificate in theology in 1981. He continued his studies after ordination, completing a Bachelor of Divinity degree from St. Paul's University, Limuru in Kenya and a Master of Arts degree in theology and development from the Oxford Centre for Mission Studies (associated with Middlesex University) in 2000.

Ordained ministry
In 1981, Ntagali was ordained in the Church of Uganda. He was a missionary in Karamoja until 1986. He then served as a parish priest in the Diocese of Bunyoro-Kitara until 2002. He was Archdeacon of Masindi from 1994 to 1999, Diocesan Secretary of Bunyoro-Kitara from 2000 to 2002, and Provincial Secretary for the Church of Uganda from 2003 to 2004.

Episcopal ministry
On 19 December 2004, Ntagali was consecrated as a bishop for the newly created Diocese of Masindi-Kitara by Archbishop Henry Orombi. Ntagali was the first bishop consecrated by Orombi.

Ntagali was elected to be the next Archbishop of Uganda by a secret ballot by all the 34 bishops of the Church of Uganda on 22 June 2011. He was installed as Archbishop on 16 December 2012 at St. Paul's Cathedral at Namirembe. In addition to serving as the Archbishop of Uganda, Ntagali serves as bishop of the Diocese of Kampala, which is the episcopal see of the archbishop. His official position is Archbishop of Uganda and Bishop of Kampala.

On 1 March 2020, having attained the retirement age of 65 years,
Bishop Ntagali will resign and be replaced Archbishop-Elect Samuel Stephen Kazimba Mugalu, who was elected on 28 August 2019, as the 9th Archbishop of Uganda.

Views
Ntagali supports the ordination of women as priests and bishops. He was a strong supporter of the later-struck-down Anti-Homosexuality Act, 2014.

Personal life
In 1978, Ntagali married Beatrice. Together, they have four sons and one daughter.

See also

Uganda Christian University
Nakasero
Church House, Uganda
List of university leaders in Uganda

References

External links
Official website of Church of Uganda

 (2004–2012)

 

1955 births
Living people
People from Kabale District
21st-century Anglican bishops in Uganda
21st-century Anglican archbishops
People from Western Region, Uganda
Anglican archbishops of Uganda
Uganda Christian University alumni
St. Paul's University, Limuru alumni
Anglican bishops of Masindi-Kitara
Anglican realignment people